Clein is a surname, most commonly indicating Lithuanian Jewish descent. Notable people with the surname include:

Louisa Clein (born 1979), English actress
Natalie Clein (born 1977), English classical cellist
Reubin Clein (1905–1989), American publisher

References